Radek is a masculine Christian name of Slavic origin. It is often nickname of Radovan, Ctirad and Radoslav. It is used as a surname and given name. Notable people with the name include:

Given name 
 Radek Baborák, Czech conductor and French horn player
 Radek Bejbl, Czech footballer
 Radek Bělohlav, Czech ice hockey player 
 Radek Bonk, Czech ice hockey player 
 Radek Dosoudil, Czech footballer
 Radek Duda, Czech ice hockey player
 Radek Dvořák, Czech ice hockey player
 Radek Faksa, Czech ice hockey player 
 Radek Jaroš, Czech mountaineer and author
 Radek John, Czech publicist, author and writer
 Radek Martínek, Czech ice hockey player
 Radek Pilař, Czech painter
 Radek Sikorski, Polish politician
 Radek Smoleňák, Czech ice hockey player
 Radek Štěpánek, Czech tennis player

Fictional characters
 Radek Zelenka, character in Stargate:Atlantis

Surname
Karl Radek (1885–1939), Bolshevik and international Communist leader
General Ivan Radek, fictional communist terrorist leader of Kazakhstan in the movie Air Force One
Viktor Radek, fictional character from the computer games Sin Episodes

Articles
Articles beginning with "Radek"

External links
Radek on Behind The Name

Masculine given names
Slavic masculine given names
Czech masculine given names